Hugh Rose, 20th Baron of Kilravock (1781-1827) was a Member of Parliament for Nairnshire and Chief of Clan Rose. The eldest son of Hugh Rose of Brea and Broadley and his wife Elizabeth Rose, Lady of Kilravock, he inherited his mother's estates and the Clan Chiefdom on her death in 1815.

Early life
Rose was born the son of Hugh Rose of Broadley and Brea and his cousin, Elizabeth Rose, 19th Baroness of Kilravock. He was born three months after the death of his father, and although he had an elder half-brother, James Rose through his father, he was heir to Kilravock Castle and the Chiefdom of Clan Rose through his mother. However initially this was questioned by his half-brother's guardian who claimed that James was the rightful heir (their father, Hugh was the paternal grandson of Hugh Rose, 15th of Kilravock, and therefore the next male heir to Hugh Rose, 18th of Kilravock), however the House of Lords found in favour of Elizabeth Rose in 1787. Elizabeth Rose wrote of it to a friend:
I have ... fought for this old Highland castle, in which I now remain the solitary descendant of a long line of ancestors, devoting my time and powers to preserve, if possible, a remnant of their ample possessions for their infant representative; and, in the meantime, I will endeavour to give him such an education as may form him to be independent of my struggle, should it prove ultimately unsuccessful. -  Rose, Hugh; Lachlan Shaw

Military
Rose entered the Inverness Militia in 1802 as a Major, and was promoted to Lieutenant Colonel. Also, in 1806 he was appointed Commandant and Colonel of the Nairn Voluntary Infantry.

Political career
On the 28 October 1812 Rose was returned as Member of Parliament for Nairnshire. This was following his great-great-grandfather, Hugh Rose, 15th of Kilravock, who had represented Nairnshire in the first Parliament of Great Britain, in 1707. He did not serve long as an MP, only until 25 June 1813, having to resign due to illness. In order to assist his resignation, on 29 June 1813 Rose was appointed Steward to the Chiltern Hundreds, a position created in the 16th century to make it possible for MPs to resign, something which it was legally impossible to do without holding another Crown Office. He was also appointed Vice-Lieutenant of Nairnshire.

Family
On 5 October 1805, Rose married Katherine Baillie, daughter of John Baillie of Dunain, they had three sons and four daughters together.
 Hugh Rose, 21st of Kilravock
 Isabella Rose
 Elizabeth Rose
 Margaret Rose
 Katherine Rose
 John Baillie Rose, 22nd of Kilravock (died 20 Sep 1854)

Katherine died on, and on 22 April 1819, he married Catherine Mackintosh of Farr, they had five sons and three daughters.
 Major James Rose, 23rd of Kilravock (died 30 March 1909)
 William Rose
 Major Wellington Rose (died 19 June 1858)
 Alexander Rose
 Major Arthur Rose (died 1858)
 Anne Rose
 Harriet Rose
 Caroline Rose

Rose died on 29 December 1827 at Kilravock Castle and was succeeded by his eldest son, Hugh.

References

External links

1781 births
1827 deaths
Clan Rose
Scottish justices of the peace
Members of the Parliament of Great Britain for Scottish constituencies
UK MPs 1812–1818
Scottish landowners